The Great Cemetery  was formerly the principal cemetery of Riga in Latvia, established in 1773. It was the main burial ground of the Baltic Germans in Latvia.

Extensive damage and removal of many headstones and graves by the Soviet authorities governing the Latvian SSR after 1945 led to the suspension of burials and the eventual conversion of the burial ground to a public park. Despite this, a significant number of old graves have survived.

The 22-hectare property is owned by the Latvian Evangelical Lutheran Church.

Origins 

Between 1771 and 1772, Catherine the Great, empress of the Russian Empire, decreed that no-one, regardless of their social standing or class origins, was to be buried in a church crypt or churchyard; all burials were to take place in the new cemeteries to be built throughout the entire Russian empire, which were to be located outside town boundaries. These measures were intended to overcome the congestion of urban church crypts and graveyards, and were prompted by a number of outbreaks of highly contagious diseases linked to inadequate burial practices in urban areas, especially the black plague which had led to the Plague Riot in Moscow in 1771.

Against this background the Great Cemetery in Riga was founded in 1773. It served as a burial ground for over 170 years for almost all Baltic Germans who died in the city between 1773 and 1944. Additionally, numerous Latvians of upper social status were buried there as well. The cemetery was divided into three section: Lutheran, Roman Catholic, and Orthodox Christian.

One of the first to be (re-)buried there was the founder of the city, Albert of Riga, whose remains were exhumed from one of the city's main churches and transferred to the cemetery in 1773.

Final burials 1939–1944 
Burials at the cemetery were drastically reduced after Hitler's forced transfer, under the Molotov–Ribbentrop Pact, of tens of thousands of Baltic Germans from Latvia in late 1939 to occupied areas in western Poland.

Burials at the cemetery continued on a much smaller scale until 1944, principally among those Baltic Germans who had refused Hitler's call to leave the region.

Situation after 1944 
Hundreds of headstones and graves were removed or destroyed by the Soviet authorities during the second occupation of the Baltic states.

In 1957 the cemetery was closed completely for any further burials and began to fall into disrepair.

In 1967 or 1969 the city council decided to bulldoze large sections of the cemetery in order to transform it into a public memorial park.

The Russian Orthodox section of the cemetery, later named Pokrov Cemetery, is the only area which was not added to the territory of the Memorial Park and therefore was the only part to remain well preserved.

Current status 

A significant number of Baltic German and Latvian graves and family plots, including a restored crypt built in 1777 and the graves of Krišjānis Barons and Krišjānis Valdemārs, have survived the post-war destruction. However, many of these graves are in an abandoned or neglected condition.

The city of Riga is currently discussing exchanging St Peter's Church for the Great Cemetery so that the city can properly take over maintenance.

Notable interments 
 Albert of Riga, founder of the city (his remains were transferred here in 1773)
 Christoph Haberland, one of Riga's chief architects
 Johann Christoph Brotze, pedagogue and ethnographer
 Krišjānis Barons, Latvian folklorist
 Jānis Fridrihs Baumanis, Latvian architect
 Andrejs Pumpurs, Latvian poet and writer.
 Johann Daniel Felsko, architect.
 Jāzeps Grosvalds, Latvian painter.
 Kārlis Mīlenbahs, Latvian linguist and lexicographer.
 Wilhelm Ostwald, Baltic German chemist and Nobel laureate.
 Heinrich Scheel, Baltic German architect.
 Georg August Schweinfurth, Baltic German botanist, explorer and ethnologist.
 Krišjānis Valdemārs, leader of the Young Latvians movement.
 George Armitstead, Mayor of Riga from 1901 to 1912

See also 
 Brothers' Cemetery (Riga)
 Kopli cemetery
 Nazi-Soviet population transfers
 List of cemeteries in Latvia

References

Sources 
 History of the cemetery (in Latvian)

External links 

 Pastors' memorial Photos of memorial to German and Latvian pastors killed by communists in 1919 at sites-of-memory.de

Baltic-German people
Cemeteries in Riga
Lutheran cemeteries
18th century in Latvia
Monuments and memorials in Latvia
Cemetery vandalism and desecration
1773 establishments in the Russian Empire